The White Rose was a non-violent, intellectual resistance group in Nazi Germany which was led by five students and one professor at the University of Munich: Willi Graf, Kurt Huber, Christoph Probst, Alexander Schmorell, Hans Scholl and Sophie Scholl. The group conducted an anonymous leaflet and graffiti campaign that called for active opposition to the Nazi regime. Their activities started in Munich on 27 June 1942; they ended with the arrest of the core group by the Gestapo on 18 February 1943. They, as well as other members and supporters of the group who carried on distributing the pamphlets, faced show trials by the Nazi People's Court; many of them were imprisoned and executed.

Hans and Sophie Scholl, as well as Christoph Probst were executed by guillotine four days after their arrest, on 22 February 1943. During the trial, Sophie interrupted the judge multiple times. No defendants were given any opportunity to speak.

The group wrote, printed and initially distributed their pamphlets in the greater Munich region. Later on, secret carriers brought copies to other cities, mostly in the southern parts of Germany. In July 1943, Allied planes dropped their sixth and final leaflet over Germany with the headline The Manifesto of the Students of Munich. In total, the White Rose authored six leaflets, which were multiplied and spread, in a total of about 15,000 copies. They denounced the Nazi regime's crimes and oppression, and called for resistance. In their second leaflet, they openly denounced the persecution and mass murder of the Jews. By the time of their arrest, the members of the White Rose were just about to establish contacts with other German resistance groups like the Kreisau Circle or the Schulze-Boysen/Harnack group of the Red Orchestra. Today, the White Rose is well known both within Germany and worldwide.

Members and supporters 

Students from the University of Munich comprised the core of the White Rose: Hans Scholl, Alexander Schmorell, Willi Graf, Christoph Probst, and Kurt Huber, a professor of philosophy and musicology. Hans's younger sister, Sophie later came to be a core member of the White Rose.

They were supported by other people, including: Otl Aicher,  ("Grogo"), Theodor Haecker, Anneliese Graf, Traute Lafrenz, Katharina Schüddekopf, Lieselotte "Lilo" Ramdohr, Falk Harnack, Marie-Luise Jahn, Manfred Eickemeyer, Helmut Bauer, Hans Conrad Leipelt, Gisela Schertling, Rudi Alt, Michael Brink, Lilo Dreyfeldt, Josef Furtmeier, Günter Ammon, Fred Thieler and Wolfgang Jaeger. Most were in their early twenties. Wilhelm Geyer taught Alexander Schmorell how to make the tin templates used in the graffiti campaign. Eugen Grimminger of Stuttgart funded their operations. Grimminger was arrested on 2 March 1943, sentenced to ten years in a penal institution for high treason by the "People's Court" on 19 April 1943, and imprisoned in Ludwigsburg penal institution until April 1945. His wife Jenny was murdered in the Auschwitz-Birkenau extermination camp, presumably on 2 December 1943. Grimminger's secretary Tilly Hahn contributed her own funds to the cause, and acted as go-between for Grimminger and the group in Munich. She frequently carried supplies such as envelopes, paper, and an additional duplicating machine from Stuttgart to Munich. In addition, a group of students in the city of Ulm distributed a number of the group's leaflets and were arrested and tried with the group from Munich. Among this group were Sophie Scholl's childhood friend Susanne Hirzel and her teenage brother  and Franz Josef Müller.

Historical and intellectual background

Germany in 1942 
White Rose survivor Jürgen Wittenstein described what it was like for ordinary Germans to live in Nazi Germany:

The activities of the White Rose started in the autumn of 1942. This was a time that was particularly critical for the Nazi regime; after initial victories in World War II, the German population became increasingly aware of the losses and damages of the war. In Summer 1942, the German Wehrmacht was preparing a new military campaign in the southern part of the Eastern front to regain the initiative after their earlier defeat close to Moscow. This German offensive was initially very successful, but came to a standstill in the autumn of 1942. In February 1943, the German army had faced a major defeat in the Battle of Stalingrad. During this time, the authors of the pamphlets could neither be discovered, nor could the campaign be stopped by the Nazi authorities. When Hans and Sophie Scholl were discovered and arrested whilst distributing leaflets at Ludwig Maximilian University of Munich, the regime reacted brutally. As the "Volksgerichtshof" was not bound to the law, but led by Nazi ideology, its actions were declared unlawful in post-war Germany. Thus, the execution of the White Rose group members, among many others, is considered as judicial murder.

Social background 
The members of the core group all shared an academic background as students at Munich University. The Scholl siblings, Christoph Probst, Willi Graf and Alexander Schmorell were all raised by independently thinking and wealthy parents. Alexander Schmorell was born in Russia, and his first language was Russian. After he and Hans Scholl had become friends at the university, Alexander invited Hans to his parents' home, where Hans also met Christoph Probst at the beginning of 1941. Alexander Schmorell and Christoph Probst had already been friends since their school days. As Christoph's father had been divorced and had married again to a Jewish wife, the effects of the Nazi Nuremberg Laws, and Nazi racial ideology had impacts on both Christoph's and Alexander's lives from early on.

The German Youth Movement and the Hitler Youth 
The ideas and thoughts of the German Youth Movement, founded in 1896, had a major impact on the German youth at the beginning of the twentieth century. The movement aimed at providing free space to develop a healthy life. A common trait of the various organizations was a romantic longing for a pristine state of things, and a return to older cultural traditions, with a strong emphasis on independent, non-conformist thinking. They propagated a return to nature, confraternity and shared adventures. The  (abbreviated as "d.j.1.11.") was part of this youth movement, founded by Eberhard Koebel in 1929.

The Nazi Party's youth organizations took over some of the elements of the Youth Movement, and engaged their members in activities similar to the adventures of the Boy Scouts, but also subjected them to ideological indoctrination. Membership in both party youth organizations was compulsory for young Germans, although a few—such as Willi Graf, Otl Aicher, and Heinz Brenner—refused to join. Sophie and Hans' sister Inge Scholl reported about the initial enthusiasm of the young people for the Nazi youth organization, to their parents' dismay:

Youth organizations other than those led by the Nazi party were dissolved and officially forbidden in 1936. Both Hans Scholl and Willi Graf were arrested in 1937–38 because of their membership in forbidden Youth Movement organizations. Hans Scholl had joined the  1. 11. in 1934, when he and other Hitler Youth members in Ulm considered membership in this group and the Hitler Youth to be compatible. Hans Scholl was also accused of transgressing the German anti-homosexuality law, because of a same-sex teen relationship dating back to 1934–1935, when Hans was only 16 years old. The argument was built partially on the work of Eckard Holler, a sociologist specializing in the German Youth Movement, as well as on the Gestapo interrogation transcripts from the 1937–38 arrest, and with reference to historian George Mosse's discussion of the homoerotic aspects of the German  Youth Movement. As Mosse indicated, idealized romantic attachments among male youths were not uncommon in Germany, especially among members of the  associations. It was argued that the experience of being persecuted may have led both Hans and Sophie to identify with the victims of the Nazi state, providing another explanation for why Hans and Sophie Scholl made their way from ardent "Hitler Youth" leaders to passionate opponents of the Nazi regime.

Religion 
The White Rose group was motivated by ethical, moral, and religious considerations. They supported and took in individuals of all backgrounds, and it did not depend on race, sex, religion, or age. They came from various religious backgrounds. Willi Graf and Katharina Schüddekopf were devout Catholics. Alexander Schmorell was an Orthodox Christian. Traute Lafrenz adhered to the concepts of anthroposophy, while Eugen Grimminger considered himself a Buddhist. Christoph Probst was baptized a Catholic only shortly before his execution. His father Hermann was nominally a Catholic, but also a private scholar of Eastern thought and wisdom. In their diaries and letters to friends, both Scholl siblings wrote about their reading of Christian scholars including Augustine of Hippo's Confessions and Etienne Gilson, whose work on Medieval philosophy they discussed amongst other philosophical works within their network of friends. The Scholls read sermons by John Henry Newman, and Sophie gave two volumes of Newman's sermons to her boyfriend, Fritz Hartnagel, when he was assigned to the Eastern Front; he wrote to her: "[W]e know by whom we are created, and that we stand in a relationship of moral obligation to our creator. Conscience gives us the capacity to distinguish between good and evil." This is a paraphrase of Newman's sermon, "The Testimony of Conscience".

Mentors and role models 

In 1941, Hans Scholl read a copy of a sermon by an outspoken critic of the Nazi regime, Catholic Bishop August von Galen, decrying the euthanasia policies expressed in Action T4 (and extended that same year to the Nazi concentration camps by Action 14f13) which the Nazis maintained would protect the German gene pool. Horrified by the Nazi policies, Sophie obtained permission to reprint the sermon and distribute it at the University of Munich.

In 1940, Otl Aicher had met Carl Muth, the founder of the Catholic magazine Hochland. Otl in turn introduced Hans Scholl to Muth in 1941. In his letters to Muth, Hans wrote about his growing attraction to the Catholic Christian faith. Both Hans and Sophie Scholl were influenced by Carl Muth whom they describe as deeply religious, and opposed to Nazism. He drew the Scholl siblings' attention to the persecution of the Jews, which he considered sinful and anti-Christian.

Both Sophie Scholl and Willi Graf attended some of Kurt Huber's lectures at the University of Munich. Kurt Huber was known amongst his students for the political innuendos which he used to include in his university lectures, by which he criticized Nazi ideology by talking about classical philosophers like Leibniz. He met Hans Scholl for the first time in June 1942, was admitted to the activities of the White Rose on 17 December 1942, and became their mentor and the main author of the sixth pamphlet.

Experience on the World War II Eastern Front 
Hans Scholl, Alexander Schmorell, Christoph Probst, and Willi Graf were medical students. Their studies were regularly interrupted by terms of compulsory service as student soldiers in the Wehrmacht medical corps on the Eastern Front. Their experience during this time had a major impact on their thinking, and it also motivated their resistance, because it led to their disillusionment with the Nazi regime. Alexander Schmorell, who was born in Orenburg and raised by Russian nurses, spoke perfect Russian, which allowed him to have direct contact and communication with the local Russian population and their plight. This Russian insight proved invaluable during their time there, and he could convey to his fellow White Rose members what was not understood or even heard by other Germans coming from the Eastern front.

In summer 1942, Hans, Alexander, and Willi had to serve for three months on the Russian front alongside many other male medical students from the University of Munich. There, they observed the horrors of war, saw beatings and other mistreatment of Jews by the Germans, and heard about the persecution of the Jews from reliable sources. Some witnessed atrocities of the war on the battlefield and against civilian populations in the East. In a letter to his sister Anneliese, Willi Graf wrote: "I wish I had been spared the view of all this which I had to witness." Gradually, detachment gave way to the conviction that something had to be done. It was not enough to keep to oneself one's beliefs, and ethical standards, but the time had come to act.

The members of the White Rose were fully aware of the risks they incurred by their acts of resistance:

Origin of the name 
Under Gestapo interrogation, Hans Scholl gave several explanations for the origin of the name "The White Rose", and suggested he may have chosen it while he was under the emotional influence of a 19th-century poem with the same name by German poet Clemens Brentano. It has also been speculated that the name might have been taken from either the Cuban poet, Jose Marti's verse "Cultivo una rosa blanca" or the novel Die Weiße Rose (The White Rose) by B. Traven, which Hans Scholl and Alex Schmorell had both read. They also wrote that the symbol of the white rose was intended to represent purity and innocence in the face of evil.

If the White Rose was indeed named after the novel, Hans Scholl's interrogation testimony may have been intentionally vague in order to protect Josef Söhngen, the anti-Nazi bookseller who had supplied this banned book. Söhngen had provided the White Rose members with a safe meeting place for the exchange of information and to receive occasional financial contributions. Söhngen kept a stash of banned books hidden in his store, and had also hidden the pamphlets when they had been printed.

Actions: The leaflets and graffiti 
After their experiences at the Eastern Front, having learned about mass murder in Poland and the Soviet Union, Hans Scholl and Alexander Schmorell felt compelled to take action. From late June until mid-July 1942, they wrote the first four leaflets. Quoting extensively from the Bible, Aristotle and Novalis, as well as Goethe and Schiller, the iconic poets of German bourgeoisie, they appealed to what they considered the German intelligentsia, believing that these people would be easily convinced by the same arguments that also motivated the authors themselves. These leaflets were left in telephone books in public phone booths, mailed to professors and students, and taken by courier to other universities for distribution. From 23 July to 30 October 1942, Graf, Scholl and Schmorell served again at the Soviet front, and activities ceased until their return. In autumn 1942, Sophie Scholl discovered that her brother Hans was one of the authors of the pamphlets, and joined the group. Shortly after, Willi Graf, and by the end of December 1942, Kurt Huber became members of the White Rose.

In January 1943, the fifth leaflet, "Aufruf an alle Deutsche!" ("Appeal to all Germans!") was produced in 6,000–9,000 copies, using a hand-operated duplicating machine. It was carried to other German Cities between 27 and 29 January 1943 by the members and supporters of the group to many cities, and then mailed from there. Copies appeared in Saarbrücken, Stuttgart, Cologne, Vienna, Freiburg, Chemnitz, Hamburg, Innsbruck and Berlin. Sophie Scholl stated during her Gestapo interrogation that from summer 1942 on, the aim of the White Rose was to address a broader range of the population. Consequently, in the fifth leaflet, the name of the group was changed from White Rose to "German Resistance Movement", and also the style of writing became more polemic and less intellectual. The students had become convinced during their military service that the war was lost: "Hitler kann den Krieg nicht gewinnen, nur noch verlängern. – Hitler cannot win the war, he can only prolong it." They appealed to renounce "national socialist subhumanism", imperialism and Prussian militarism "for all time". The reader was urged to "Support the resistance movement!" in the struggle for "freedom of speech, freedom of religion and protection of the individual citizen from the arbitrary action of criminal dictator-states". These were the principles that would form "the foundations of a new Europe".

By the end of January 1943, the Battle of Stalingrad ended with the capitulation and near-total loss of the Wehrmacht's Sixth Army. In Stalingrad, World War II had taken a decisive turn, inspiring resistance movements throughout the European countries then occupied by Germany. It also had a devastating effect on German morale. On 13 January 1943, a student riot broke out at Munich University after a speech by the Nazi Gauleiter of Munich and Upper Bavaria, in which he had denounced male students not serving in the army as skulkers and had also made obscene remarks to female students. These events encouraged the members of the White Rose. When the defeat at Stalingrad was officially announced, they sent out their sixth—and last—leaflet. The tone of this writing, authored by Kurt Huber and revised by Hans Scholl and Alexander Schmorell, was more patriotic. Headed "Fellow students!" (the now-iconic Kommilitoninnen! Kommilitonen!), it announced that the "day of reckoning" had come for "the most contemptible tyrant our people has ever endured." "The dead of Stalingrad adjure us!"

On 3, 8, and 15 February 1943, Alexander Schmorell, Hans Scholl, and Willi Graf used tin stencils to write slogans like "Down with Hitler" and "Freedom" on the walls of the university and other buildings in Munich.

Capture, Gestapo interrogation and trial 

On 18 February 1943, the Scholls brought a suitcase full of leaflets to the university main building. They hurriedly dropped stacks of copies in the empty corridors for students to find when they left the lecture rooms. Leaving before the lectures had ended, the Scholls noticed that there were some left-over copies in the suitcase and decided to distribute them. Sophie flung the last remaining leaflets from the top floor down into the atrium. This spontaneous action was observed by the university maintenance man, Jakob Schmid, who called the Gestapo. The university doors were locked, and the fate of brother and sister were sealed. Hans and Sophie Scholl were taken into Gestapo custody. A draft of a seventh pamphlet, written by Christoph Probst, was found in the possession of Hans Scholl at the time of his arrest by the Gestapo. While Sophie Scholl got rid of incriminating evidence before being taken into custody, Hans did try to destroy the draft of the last leaflet by tearing it apart and trying to swallow it. However, the Gestapo recovered enough of it and were able to match the handwriting with other writings from Probst, which they found when they searched Hans's apartment.
Christoph was captured on 20 February. The main Gestapo interrogator was Robert Mohr, who initially thought Sophie was innocent. However, after Hans had confessed, Sophie assumed full responsibility in an attempt to protect other members of the White Rose.

The Scholls and Probst were scheduled to stand trial before the Volksgerichtshof—the Nazi "People's Court" infamous for its unfair political trials, which more often than not ended with a death sentence—on 22 February 1943. They were found guilty of treason. Roland Freisler, head judge of the court, sentenced them to death. The three were executed the same day by guillotine at Stadelheim Prison. Sophie went under the guillotine first, followed by Hans and then Christoph. While Sophie and Christoph were silent as they died, Hans yelled "es lebe die Freiheit!" (long live freedom) as the blade fell.

Willi Graf had already been arrested on 18 February 1943; in his interrogations, which continued until his execution in October 1943, he successfully covered other members of the group. Alexander Schmorell was recognized, denounced and arrested on 24 February 1943, after his return to Munich following an unsuccessful effort to travel to Switzerland. Kurt Huber was taken into custody on 26 February, and only then did the Gestapo learn about his role within the White Rose group.

The second White Rose trial took place on 19 April 1943. On trial were Hans Hirzel, Susanne Hirzel, Franz Josef Müller, Heinrich Guter, Eugen Grimminger, Otto Aicher, Theodor Haecker, Willi Graf, Anneliese Graf, Heinrich Bollinger, Helmut Bauer and Falk Harnack. At the last minute, the prosecutor added Traute Lafrenz, Gisela Schertling and Katharina Schüddekopf. Willi Graf, Kurt Huber, and Alexander Schmorell were sentenced to death. Eleven others were sentenced to prison, and Falk Harnack was acquitted of the accusations, which was unexpected, given that his brother and sister had been killed by the Nazis for subversive activities. Schmorell and Huber were executed on 13 July 1943. Willi Graf was kept in solitary confinement for about seven months. During that time, he was tortured in an attempt to make him give up other names of members of The White Rose. He never gave up any names, even when the Gestapo threatened to capture his family if he continued to withhold information.  He was executed on 12 October 1943.  On 29 January 1945, Hans Konrad Leipelt was executed. He had been sent down from Hamburg University in 1940 because of his Jewish ancestry, and had copied and further distributed the White Rose's pamphlets together with his girlfriend Marie-Luise Jahn. The pamphlets were now entitled "And their spirit lives on."

The third White Rose trial was scheduled for 20 April 1943, Hitler's birthday, which was a public holiday in Nazi Germany. Judge Freisler had intended to issue death sentences against Wilhelm Geyer, Harald Dohrn, Josef Söhngen and Manfred Eickemeyer. Because he did not want to issue too many death sentences in a single trial, he therefore wanted to postpone his judgment against those four until the next day. However, the evidence against them was lost, and the trial finally took place on 13 July 1943. In that trial, Gisela Schertling—who had betrayed most of the friends, even fringe members like Gerhard Feuerle—changed her mind and recanted her testimony against all of them. Since Freisler did not preside over the third trial, the judge acquitted for lack of evidence all but Söhngen, who was sentenced to a six months' term in prison. After her acquittal on 19 April, Traute Lafrenz was placed under arrest again. She spent the last year of the war in prison. Trials kept being postponed and moved to different locations because of Allied air raids. Her trial was finally set for April 1945, after which she probably would have been executed. Three days before the trial, however, the Allies liberated the town where she was held prisoner, thereby saving her life.

Reactions in Germany and abroad during World War II 
The hopes of the White Rose members that the defeat at Stalingrad would incite German opposition against the Nazi regime and the war effort did not come true. On the contrary, Nazi propaganda used the defeat to call on the German people to embrace "Total War". Coincidentally, on 18 February 1943, the same day that saw the arrests of Sophie and Hans Scholl and Willi Graf, Nazi propaganda minister Joseph Goebbels delivered his Sportpalast speech, and he was enthusiastically applauded by his audience.

Shortly after the arrest of the Scholl siblings and Christoph Probst, newspapers published all-points bulletins in search of Alexander Schmorell. On 22 February 1943, the students of Munich were assembled, and officially protested against the "traitors" who came from within their ranks. Gestapo and Nazi jurisdiction documented in their files their view of the White Rose members as "traitors and defeatists". On 23 February, the official newspaper of the Nazi party, Völkischer Beobachter and local newspapers in Munich briefly reported about the capture and execution of some "degenerate rogues". However, the network of friends and supporters proved to be too large, so that the rumors about the White Rose could not be suppressed any more by Nazi German officials. Further prosecutions took place until the end of World War II, and German newspapers continued to report, mostly in brief notes, that more people had been arrested and punished. On 15 March 1943, a report by the Sicherheitsdienst of the Schutzstaffel stated that rumors about the leaflets spread "considerable unrest" amongst the German population. The report expressed particular concern about the fact that leaflets were not handed in to the Nazi authorities by their finders as promptly as they used to be in the past.

On 18 April 1943, The New York Times mentioned the student opposition in Munich. The paper also published articles on the first White Rose trials on 29 March 1943 and 25 April 1943. Though they did not correctly record all of the information about the resistance, the trials, and the execution, they were the first acknowledgement of the White Rose in the United States.

On 27 June 1943, the German author and Nobel prize winner Thomas Mann, in his monthly anti-Nazi broadcasts by the BBC called "Deutsche Hörer!" ("German Listeners!") highly praised the White Rose members' courage. Soviet Army propaganda issued a leaflet, wrongly attributed by later researchers to the National Committee for a Free Germany, in honour of the White Rose's fight for freedom.

The text of the sixth leaflet of the White Rose was smuggled out of Germany through Scandinavia to the United Kingdom by the German lawyer and member of the Kreisau Circle, Helmuth James Graf von Moltke. In July 1943, copies were dropped over Germany by Allied planes, retitled "The Manifesto of the Students of Munich". Thus, the activities of the White Rose became widely known in World War II Germany, but, like other attempts at resistance, did not succeed in provoking widespread active opposition against the totalitarian regime within the German population. However, it continued to be an important inspiration for acts of individual or small-scale resistance throughout the final years of the war.

Research history 
For many years the primary sources for research were limited to those provided by White Rose members and their supporters. These included Inge Scholl's 1952 commemorative book "The White Rose", surviving copies of the pamphlets, the letters and diaries of Sophie and Hans Scholl and Willi Graf,<ref>Anneliese Knoop-Graf, Inge Jens (ed.): Willi Graf – Briefe und Aufzeichnungen – Letters and [diary] records. Berlin, 1994, Fischer Verlag, in German</ref> and other people with direct knowledge of the group's activities.Otl Aicher: innenseiten des kriegs – the inside of war. 3rd ed., 1998, Fischer Verlag, Berlin,  With the end of communism in the Soviet Union and the German Democratic Republic in the early 1990s, the Gestapo interrogation protocols and other documents from Nazi authorities became publicly available. The interrogation protocols were part of the Volksgerichtshof documents, and were confiscated by the Soviet Red Army, and brought to Moscow. Here, they were kept secret in a special archive. After the foundation of the German Democratic Republic, the major part of the Nazi documents were handed over to the East German government, except the documents concerning Alexander Schmorell, who was born in Russia. The documents were distributed between the Central Archive of the communist Socialist Unity Party of Germany and the archive of the Ministry for State Security. With the German reunification, the documents were transferred to the Federal Archive of Germany in Berlin, and finally published. The documents concerning Alexander Schmorell still remain in the State Military Archive of Russia, but have been fully transcribed and published in a German/Russian edition.

 Memorials and legacy 

With the fall of Nazi Germany, the White Rose came to represent opposition to tyranny in the German psyche and was lauded for acting without interest in personal power or self-aggrandizement. Their story became so well known that the composer Carl Orff claimed (falsely by some accounts) to his Allied interrogators that he was a founding member of the White Rose and was released. He was personally acquainted with Huber, but there is no evidence that Orff was ever involved in the movement.

On 5 February 2012 Alexander Schmorell was canonized as a New Martyr by the Orthodox Church.

The square where the central hall of Munich University is located has been named "Geschwister-Scholl-Platz" after Hans and Sophie Scholl; the square opposite to it is "Professor-Huber-Platz". Two large fountains are in front of the university, one on either side of Ludwigstraße. The fountain in front of the university is dedicated to Hans and Sophie Scholl. The other, across the street, is dedicated to Professor Huber. Many schools, streets, and other places across Germany are named in memory of the members of the White Rose.

In Paris, a high school of the 17th arrondissement (collège La Rose Blanche), is named after the White Rose, and a public park pays homage to Hans and Sophie Scholl.

One of Germany's leading literary prizes is called the Geschwister-Scholl-Preis (the "Scholl Siblings" prize). Likewise, the asteroid 7571 Weisse Rose is named after the group.

The Audimax of the Bundeswehr Medical Academy in Munich was named after Hans Scholl in 2012. The Joint Medical Service of the Bundeswehr, named barracks north of Munich after Christoph Probst at his 100th birthday in 2019.

The last surviving member of the group was Traute Lafrenz. She turned 100 years old on 3 May 2019 and was rewarded the Order of Merit of the Federal Republic of Germany on that same date for her work as part of the White Rose. She died on 6 March 2023.

In 2021, a conspiracy theorist group known as the "White Rose" had appropriated the name of the White Rose anti-Nazi resistance group to make an analogy between the original White Rose's non-violent resistance against Nazism and the non-violent supposed "resistance" by the conspiracy theorists against COVID-19 lockdowns and other measures by national governments intended to stop the virus during the COVID-19 pandemic in the early 2020s, which the conspiracy theorists falsely claim was the secret establishment of a worldwide totalitarian Nazi-style government. The methods of the White Rose conspiracy theorists are somewhat similar to the original White Rose anti-Nazi resisters in that the conspiracy theorists printed stickers asking for resistance against anti-Covid measures alongside the "White Rose" name with the address of their Telegram group, then posting the stickers in public places. The use of the internet means that the conspiracy theorists can spread their misinformation and gain members across the world unlike the original White Rose who were limited in both regards to Germany. Apart from the name, there is absolutely no connection between the original White Rose and the conspiracy theorists who took their name and neither the last surviving member Traute Lafrenz nor any relatives or decedents of deceased members have joined the conspiracy theorists or publicly commented on the appropriation of their name.

 References 

Further reading
DeVita, James The Silenced. HarperCollins, 2006. Young adult novel inspired by Sophie Scholl and The White Rose. 
 DeVita, James The Rose of Treason, Anchorage Press Plays. Young adult play of the story of The White Rose. 
 Dumbach, Annette & Newborn, Jud. Sophie Scholl & The White Rose. First published as "Shattering the German Night", 1986; expanded, updated edition Oneworld Publications, 2006. 
Graf, Willi. Willi Graf: Briefe und Aufzeichnungen, (Willi Graf, Letters and Records)  NOTE: only available in GermanHanser, Richard. A Noble Treason: The Revolt of the Munich Students Against Hitler. New York: G.P. Putnam's Sons, 1979. Print. 
 Lloyd, Alexandra (ed.), The White Rose: Reading, Writing, Resistance. Oxford: Taylor Institution Library, 2019. 
 McDonough, Frank, Sophie Scholl: The Real Story of the Woman Who Defied Hitler, History Press, 2009. 
Richard-Wilson, Stephani. Willi Graf of the White Rose: The Role of Bildung in His Decision to Resist National Socialism. Willi Graf of the White Rose: The Role of Bildung in His Decision to Resist National Socialism – ProQuest Sachs, Ruth Hanna. Two Interviews: Hartnagel and Wittenstein (Annotated). Ed. Denise Heap and Joyce Light. Los Angeles: Exclamation!, 2005. 
 Sachs, Ruth Hanna. White Rose History, Volume I: Coming Together (31 January 1933 – 30 April 1942). Lehi, Utah: Exclamation! Publishers, 2002. 
 Sachs, Ruth Hanna. White Rose History, Volume II: Journey to Freedom (1 May 1942 – 12 October 1943). Lehi, Utah: Exclamation! Publishers, 2005. 
 Sachs, Ruth Hanna. White Rose History, Volume III: Fighters to the Very End (13 October 1943 – 8 May 1945). 
 Sachs, Ruth Hanna. White Rose History: The Ultimate CD-ROM (1933–1945).
Scholl, Hans and Sophie. At The Heart of the White Rose: Letters and Diaries of Hans and Sophie Scholl. 
 Scholl, Inge. The White Rose: Munich, 1942–1943. Middletown, CT: Wesleyan University Press, 1983. 
 Shrimpton, Paul. Conscience before Conformity: Hans and Sophie Scholl and the White Rose Resistance in Nazi Germany. Gracewing, 2018. 
 Vinke, Hermann. The Short Life of Sophie Scholl. Trans. Hedwig Pachter. New York: Harper & Row, 1984. Print. 
 Wilson, Kip. White Rose. Boston, MA: Houghton Mifflin Harcourt, 2019. 
 

 Primary sources 
 English translation of all seven leaflets

 The White Rose Leaflets 
 Leaflet I  (Text / Original as PDF)
 Leaflet II  (Text / Original as PDF)
 Leaflet III  (Text / Original as PDF)
 Leaflet IV  (Text / Original as PDF)
 Leaflet V  (Text / Original as PDF)
 Leaflet VI  (Text / Original as PDF)

 Primary source materials in English translation 
 Leaflets Online (English) via libcom.com
 White Rose pamphlets in English, translated by students at the University of Oxford (UK).
 Court testimony, records and documents (English) via the Center for White Rose Studies
 Alexander Schmorell: Gestapo Interrogation Transcripts. RGWA I361K-I-8808. 
 Gestapo Interrogation Transcripts: Graf & Schmorell (NJ). 
 Gestapo Interrogation Transcripts: Scholls & Probst (ZC 13267). 
 The "Bündische Jugend" Trials (Scholl/Reden): 1937–1938. 
 Third White Rose Trial: 13 July 1943 (Eickemeyer, Söhngen, Dohrn, and Geyer). 
 Scholl, Hans, and Sophie Scholl. At the Heart of the White Rose: Letters and Diaries of Hans and Sophie Scholl''. Ed. Inge Jens. Trans. Maxwell Brownjohn. New York: Harper & Row, 1987.

External links

 Center for White Rose Studies – Making the White Rose relevant to the 21st century
 The White Rose: Information, links, discussion, etc.
 Wittenstein, George. Memories of the White Rose
 WagingPeace.org, Waging Peace article on The White Rose
 Holocaust Rescuers Bibliography with information and links to books about The White Rose and other resistance groups
 "Weiße Rose Stiftung", FJ Müller et al., 1943–2009, Weisse-Rose-Stiftung.de 
 Case Study: The White Rose by the UK's Holocaust Memorial Day, for educational and commemorative purposes
 "White Rose", United States Holocaust Memorial Museum
 BBC World Service: episode of Witness broadcast on 22 February 2013.
 The White Rose Project: a research and outreach initiative at the University of Oxford telling the story of the White Rose in the UK
 'Defying Hitler: The White Rose Resistance Group', lecture given by Dr Alexandra Lloyd at the University of Oxford introducing the White Rose and their resistance writings. 

 
1940s in Munich
German resistance to Nazism
German Youth Movement
Political repression in Nazi Germany
Mass media companies of Germany